The North Pepin Independent 1856-1857 was the first newspaper in Pepin County, Wisconsin. Pepin county is located on the Western border of Wisconsin. Also known as The Pepin Independent, it was founded December 24, 1856, by U.B. Shaver until June 20, 1857. It was distributed weekly in North Pepin County and Dunn County in Wisconsin. Volume 1 consisted of 23 issues and volume 2 included. The North Pepin Independent was suspended within a year, but was revived in April 1858, by E.W. Gurley and E.B. Newcomb. In the following year of October 1859, it was again suspended. The North Pepin Independent had a brief existence but is available on microfilm from The State Historical Society of Wisconsin.

Coverage
The 4 page North Pepin Independent was a reporter of the time, the people, and the county. The opening page covered advertisements, business cards, news updates, and election results. The second page started filling up with articles, mostly written by local community members. The third page was continued articles and the location of advertisements, many of which were for local stores. One could also find help wanted and things for sale on the third page. The final page had more advertisements and the newspaper contributors had their own sections to talk about their opinions.

Advertising Rates: The rates for a business to advertise on a per year basis: One column: $60, half column: $35, quarter column: $20, and one square: $10.

References 

Defunct newspapers published in Wisconsin
Pepin County, Wisconsin